Double-strand break repair protein MRE11 is an enzyme that in humans is encoded by the MRE11 gene. The gene has been designated MRE11A to distinguish it from the pseudogene MRE11B that is nowadays named MRE11P1.

Function 

This gene encodes a nuclear protein involved in homologous recombination, telomere length maintenance, and DNA double-strand break repair. By itself, the protein has 3' to 5' exonuclease activity and endonuclease activity. The protein forms a complex with the RAD50 homolog; this complex is required for nonhomologous joining of DNA ends and possesses increased single-stranded DNA endonuclease and 3' to 5' exonuclease activities. In conjunction with a DNA ligase, this protein promotes the joining of noncomplementary ends in vitro using short homologies near the ends of the DNA fragments. This gene has a pseudogene on chromosome 3. Alternative splicing of this gene results in two transcript variants encoding different isoforms.

Orthologs
Mre11, an ortholog of human MRE11, occurs in the prokaryote archaeon Sulfolobus acidocaldarius.  In this organism the Mre11 protein interacts with the Rad50 protein and appears to have an active role in the repair of DNA damages experimentally introduced by gamma radiation.  Similarly, during meiosis in the eukaryotic protist Tetrahymena Mre11 is required for repair of DNA damages, in this case double-strand breaks, by a process that likely involves homologous recombination.  These observations suggest that human MRE11 is descended from prokaryotic and protist ancestral Mre11 proteins that served a role in early processes for repairing DNA damage.

Overexpression in cancer
MRE11 has a role in microhomology-mediated end joining (MMEJ) repair of double strand breaks.  It is one of 6 enzymes required for this error prone DNA repair pathway.  MRE11 is over-expressed in breast cancers.

Cancers are very often deficient in expression of one or more DNA repair genes, but over-expression of a DNA repair gene is less usual in cancer.  For instance, at least 36 DNA repair enzymes, when mutationally defective in germ line cells, cause increased risk of cancer (hereditary cancer syndromes).  (Also see DNA repair-deficiency disorder.)  Similarly, at least 12 DNA repair genes have frequently been found to be epigenetically repressed in one or more cancers. (See also Epigenetically reduced DNA repair and cancer.)  Ordinarily, deficient expression of a DNA repair enzyme results in increased un-repaired DNA damages which, through replication errors (translesion synthesis), lead to mutations and cancer. However, MRE11 mediated MMEJ repair is highly inaccurate, so in this case, over-expression, rather than under-expression, apparently leads to cancer.

Interactions 

MRE11 has been shown to interact with:
 ATM, 
 BRCA1,
 Ku70, 
 MDC1, 
 NBN, 
 Rad50,  and
 TERF2.

See also 
 Homologous recombination

References

Further reading